Fabian Menig (born 26 February 1994) is a German professional footballer who plays as a centre back or right back for 1. FC Nürnberg II.

Club career
At the end of May 2019, FC Admira Wacker Mödling confirmed that they had signed Menig on a one-year contract.

On 21 January 2022, Menig moved to 1. FC Nürnberg II.

References

External links
 

Living people
1994 births
People from Leutkirch im Allgäu
Sportspeople from Tübingen (region)
Footballers from Baden-Württemberg
German footballers
Association football defenders
SC Freiburg II players
VfR Aalen players
SC Preußen Münster players
FC Admira Wacker Mödling players
Hallescher FC players
1. FC Nürnberg II players
3. Liga players
Austrian Football Bundesliga players
German expatriate footballers
German expatriate sportspeople in Austria
Expatriate footballers in Austria